Cahokia Downs was an American horse racing track located on Highway 15 near the town of Alorton, St. Clair County, Illinois. Run by the East St. Louis Jockey Club, the facility opened in 1954 and hosted both Standardbred harness racing and Thoroughbred flat racing events.

At Cahokia Downs on October 18, 1978, jockey David Gall became the first rider in United States Thoroughbred horse racing to win eight races on a single racecard.

In October 1979 the Illinois Racing Commission refused to authorize any 1980 racing dates for Cahokia Downs and on April 2, 1980 the business filed for bankruptcy. The track never reopened.

Physical attributes
The track consisted of a .75-mile (1.207 km) oval with sandy clay soil, with chutes that enabled 5-furlong (1.006 km) races to be run around one turn and about 11/16 miles (1.710 km) around three turns. Distance from the last turn to the finish line was 500 feet (152 m). The front and back straightaways were both 80 feet (24.38 m) wide.
 The chute on the front straightaway was angled approximately 15 degrees to avoid bisecting a street in the stable area.

References

Information on Cahokia Downs in The Logic and Limits of Bankruptcy Law by Thomas H. Jackson. (2001)  

Sports venues completed in 1954
1979 disestablishments in Illinois
Defunct horse racing venues in Illinois
Buildings and structures in St. Clair County, Illinois